Hounds are the name given to several fictional groups of mutant characters appearing in American comic books published by Marvel Comics. This term usually refers to those who track or hunt down mutants while serving a higher authority.

History

Days of Future Past
The Hounds were first introduced in Uncanny X-Men, from the "Days of Future Past" dystopian timeline, as part of the backstory of Rachel Summers. These brainwashed mutant hunters were created and commanded by the cyborg Ahab, who used them to hunt down and imprison mutants in concentration camps. Rachel was forced to become one of these Hounds while still an adolescent, which scarred and haunted her for years afterward. Eventually she broke her conditioning and rebelled. As a result, Rachel was sent to the camps herself as punishment.

Shadow King's Hounds
Shadow King is later seen to use mind-controlled humans called Hounds to track Storm, who had been transformed into a child by the villainous Nanny. These Hounds were reduced to a nearly mindless, animalistic state by the Shadow King apparently for his own amusement.

Other versions

Age of Apocalypse
In the Age of Apocalypse reality, the Hounds are mutants used to hunt down and imprison mutants and humans in concentration camps or simply to kill their targets. Sabretooth was used as the leading Hound to the Horsemen until his defection. Wild Child was too ferocious that he was kept a prisoner until Sabretooth rescued him. Caliban was used as the prime hound to the Bounty Hunters. Wolverine was a mutant altered by Beast who served Holocaust as his leading hunter after the defection of Sabretooth.

Spider-Verse
In the "Spider-Verse" storyline, the Hounds of Earth-001 are servants of Verna of the Inheritors. They consist of Sable, Fireheart, Kravinoff, five different Vultures, the Scorpion, the Rhino, Hammerhead, Ox, a Hobgoblin, and various Green Goblins. Sable, Fireheart, and Kravinoff of the Hounds accompany Verna to Earth-1610 to hunt Miles Morales. Miles Morales and Jessica Drew struggle to hold off Verna's Hounds. Verna laments that the hunt is over before it began. Superior Spider-Man (Otto Octavius's mind in Peter Parker's body), Assassin Spider-Man, and Spider-Punk emerge from a portal and immediately incapacitate the Hounds. While Verna mourns the deaths of her Hounds, Miles looks at the shattered gravestone of his mother and says she made things personal between them with Verna furiously responding that she will feast on his bones. Verna later sent the Vultures after the Ben Reilly of Earth-94. Reilly defeats them with the aid of Spider-Ham and the Old Man Spider-Man of Earth-4 Verna, Rhino, and Scorpion arrive to hunt Hobgoblin (who was the identity of this world's Peter Parker) and drain his life force. They are thwarted by Spider-Woman of Earth-65 who then escapes with Hobgoblin. In the final battle, Verna has an army of Green Goblins.

During the "Spider-Geddon" storyline, Verna begins her hunt for the crystal containing Solus' lifeforce with he help of her Hounds which consist of Sable, Fireheart, Kravinoff, and Scorpion as well as Chameleon being the latest Hound. They compete with Kaine Parker's group to get to the crystal first.

In other media

Television

Live action

The Hounds feature in the X-Men film universe spin-off television series, The Gifted. They are directly referenced first during a scene in the season one episode titled "boXed in". In the series, the Hounds' villainous leader Roderick Campbell is portrayed by Garret Dillahunt.

Animation
In the X-Men episode "The Fifth Horseman," it showed a foursome of mutants serving Apocalypse who were called Hounds (rather than the Horsemen of Apocalypse despite the title of the episode). Their costumes were based on those of the Days of Future Past Hounds. Three of them were unnamed, but the fourth was Caliban of the Morlocks (who in the comics was one of the Horsemen of Apocalypse).

References

External links
 Hounds (Earth-811) at Marvel Wiki
 Hounds (Earth-295) at Marvel Wiki
 Hounds (Earth-001) at Marvel Wiki
 Hounds at Comic Vine

Marvel Comics mutants